Radio Surprises (French: Les surprises de la radio) is a 1940 French comedy film directed by Marcel Aboulker and starring Marguerite Moreno, Armand Bernard and Grégoire Aslan. It is a revue show. It was shot at the Epinay Studios in Paris. The film's sets were designed by the art director Marcel Magniez.

Cast

References

Bibliography 
 Quinlan, David. Quinlan's Film Stars. Batsford, 2000.

External links 
 

1940 films
1940 comedy films
French comedy films
1940s French-language films
Films directed by Marcel Aboulker
French black-and-white films
Films shot at Epinay Studios
1940s French films